Christopher Aikman is a Canadian astrophysicist who spent most of his career (from 1968 to 2000) at the Dominion Astrophysical Observatory, National Research Council Canada in Saanich, British Columbia, Canada.

Early life and education 
An early interest in astronomy led Aikman to join the Royal Astronomical Society of Canada Quebec Centre in 1958, at the age of 15.

He received a B.Sc. from Bishop's University in 1965 and a M.Sc. from the University of Toronto in 1968. His thesis  was based on microwave surveys of selected emission nebulae in the northern Milky Way made with the 46-m radio telescope of the Algonquin Radio Observatory, including the emission nebula IC1795. This revealed what is perhaps the youngest stellar object in the Galaxy, namely W3(OH), a cocoon star  invisible at optical wavelengths but surrounded by a rapidly expanding ultracompact HII region, all within a dense obscuring dust shell. W3(OH) had previously been located in 1966 as the source of the first radio-identified astrophysical maser.

Career 
He began working for the Dominion Astrophysical Observatory in 1968 as the Director's scientific assistant. His initial research was on the spectroscopy of comets, and of chemically peculiar stars whose surface compositions differ markedly from that of the Sun, with the aim of understanding the origin of their anomalies. This led to the discovery of a chemically peculiar star, HR 7775, having extraordinary enhancements of the element gold in its atmosphere.

A twenty-year study of the B6III star 3 Vulpeculae by D. P. Hube and Aikman led to the early recognition of a group of hot, variable stars now known as slowly pulsating B-type stars (SPB stars).

From 1991, he conducted a program of tracking Earth approaching asteroids with the historic telescope built by John S. Plaskett, but the project was cancelled in 1997.

He was the Canadian representative on the Spaceguard Foundation, a group concerned with assessing the asteroid impact threat to Earth. An incidental product of this research was the discovery of four asteroids between 1994 and 1998 (as credited by the Minor Planet Center).

References

Selected publications 
 
 
 
 
 
 
 
 
 
 
 
 
 
 
 

1943 births
20th-century Canadian astronomers
Living people
Discoverers of asteroids
Scientists from British Columbia
Bishop's University alumni
University of Toronto alumni
Canadian astrophysicists
21st-century Canadian astronomers
Scientists from Quebec